Majene is the administrative capital of Majene Regency and it is located in the Indonesian province of West Sulawesi.

People 

The population at the 2020 Census was 73,883 people, 52% of which are female and 48% of which are male. The town is divided into two districts (kecamatan): Banggae and Banggae Timur. In 2009, the average population density for Banggae was 1,514 people per square kilometre while the density for East Banggae was 834 people per square kilometre. 46.7% of the population consists of individuals under the age of 20, while 76.3% of the population consists of individuals under the age of 40.

(Source: Majene Census Bureau)

The largest population group are those of Mandar tribal origins. The next largest ethnic group represented in the town are the Buginese. The remaining ethnic groups living in the city are mixed and include Javanese, Makassarese, Madurese, and ethnic Chinese, and people from Mamasa, Enrekang, Minang and Tana Toraja. Each of these groups has its own corresponding languages.

History 
As word-of-mouth accounts and limited written documentation of Mandar history reveal, there were seven coastal Mandar kingdoms and seven inland Mandar kingdoms. The coastal kingdoms included Balanipa (now known as Tinambung), Sendana, Bangai (now known as Majene), Pamboang, Tapalan, Mamuju, and Binuang (now known as Polewali). The inland kingdoms included Rantebulahan, Mambi, Arale, Tabulahan, Taban, Bambang, and Matanga.

The three kingdoms that occupied present day Majene Regency were Bangai, Pamboang (encompassing the sub-kingdom of Malunda), and Sendana. Peace was maintained among the seven coastal kingdoms by the “Pitu Ba’ba binanga” treaty, which essentially stated that the kingdoms had more to gain by living peacefully alongside each other than by warring for incidental gains in territory. The inland kingdoms also had a treaty known as “Pitu Uluna Salu”, which also prevented warring amongst themselves.

The Dutch Era 

It is said that the Mandar people were brave sailors who used their prowess on the sea to travel between Ternate and Singapore, safely shuttling spices and other rare commodities from destination to destination. Majene's strategic location as a remote “middle-ground” between the Spice Islands of Maluku and the Asian mainland made it an attractive target for Dutch intervention, which sought to intercept and monopolise the Maritime Southeast Asia trade routes.

In 1667, the Gowa Kingdom of South Sulawesi and the Dutch signed the Bungaya Treaty, which not only promised cooperation between the local South Sulawesi people and Dutch forces, but also stated that every kingdom that has an existing treaty with Gowa must also acknowledge the Bungaya Treaty. As regular traders with the Gowa Kingdom, the Mandar people would thus be submitting to the Dutch by default. However, when the Mandar kingdoms collectively refused to adhere to the provisions of this treaty, the Dutch chose to intervene with force.

As a result, in 1674, the Bone king Arung Palakka arrived in Majene with the Dutch to attack the Mandar kingdoms for their violation of the treaty. The Dutch could not defeat the Mandar people on their first attempt. All the kingdoms were united by this common enemy and were galvanized to share resources to defend the homeland. Traditional warfare in Majene was led by Daeng Rioso and Raja Bangai using traditional swords, keris daggers, and spears.

On their second attempt to gain control over West Sulawesi, the Dutch Republic orchestrated another treaty between the king of Bone and some of the Mandar kingdoms stating that the Mandar kingdoms could no longer enter in agreements and contracts with each other and instead must work entirely through the Bone Kingdom, which at the time was controlled by the Dutch. There was also a provision stating that if anyone attacked the Bone Kingdom, the Mandar kingdoms would rush to their aid and vice versa. The treaty was signed near Pinrang and sought to divide up the kingdoms and make them less of a threat. Though this treaty was immediately ineffective, it was the beginning of the unraveling of the Mandar kingdoms in the face of the Dutch.

The Bone treaty allowed the Dutch to conduct business with the Mandar people through the Bone intermediary, and as stipulated in the agreement, the Dutch did not interfere in governmental affairs of the Mandar people - though they did have a heavy influence on business and commerce. However, the treaty only proved to be only marginally effective in keeping the Mandar people at bay, and the Dutch realized that only total control over the region would lead to the most successful trade monopoly.

So, in their third and final attempt to weaken the Mandar kingdoms, the Dutch fell back on their time-tested “divide et impera” strategy and hired Indonesian spies to foment revolution and weaken the kings from the inside. Rumors were started, the royal governing parties became insulted (in many cases, over the alleged beauty of Mandar queens), and provocations ensued.

Then, in 1905, the Royal Netherlands East Indies Army arrived in full in Mandar territory, where they fought the Mandar people for two years until the natives surrendered in 1907. Strong Mandar leaders were jailed in Makassar at Fort Rotterdam and the Dutch occupation in the newly termed “Afdeling Mandar” began. The territory was supervised by a single Dutch Resident Assistant (Governor), who at the time also controlled the entire island of Sulawesi.

The sub-Afdeling (or county) territorial boundaries outlined by the Dutch still stand today and denote the difference between Majene, Polewali, Mamasa, and Mamuju. Each area was led by a Dutchman called the “controller”. During this period, kings were still present and had some power, but they were largely just puppet kingdoms controlled entirely by the Dutch.

Majenites remember the Dutch era as being particularly harsh – a time where their culture was stifled and even suffocated. Mandar people were enslaved, stripped of all rights, forced to work on Dutch projects, and generally treated very poorly. Moreover, the colonizers did not acknowledge any of the local languages spoken by the inhabitants of the Mandar kingdoms and denied them access to education.

The Japanese Era 

The Dutch era was followed by the Japanese era during World War II. Between 1942 and 1943, the Japanese arrived in West Sulawesi and seized all territory under Dutch control after the Netherlands capitulated to Japan. The Japanese strategy for ridding Asia of all western occupiers was to win the hearts and support of the locals by assuming the role of the “older brother” and promising to act in the best of interests for Indonesia upon arrival.

At the outset, the Japanese treated the Mandar people well. They offered them education, allowed them to speak their native language, and even trained the youth for war against the Allied Forces. Then, at the end of 1943, after they had gained their respect and trust, the Japanese forcibly took the land from the Mandar people as well as anything that was produced on it, effectively starving them and re-driving them into extreme poverty. Majenites say that in the transitional phase between occupations, they were passing “from the mouth of the crocodile to the mouth of the tiger”. Many agree that the Asian occupation was far worse than the western one.

When the atomic bomb was dropped on Hiroshima and Nagasaki in 1945, the Japanese, having lost the war, left Sulawesi. Shortly thereafter, the Allied Forces (consisting mostly of Australians and Americans) arrived in 1946 to temporarily restore order and move the remaining Japanese troops to Baruga, an area just outside Mandar territory. The Dutch accompanied them as well, even though they weren't technically members of the Allied Forces, in an effort to use this chaotic opportunity to regain the influence they had lost at the hand of the Japanese. In effect, they were trying for the fourth time to control Mandar territory. Even though Indonesia was declared independent in 1945, the Mandar people continued to fight the Dutch in the Majene region until they accepted Indonesia's sovereignty in 1948.

The Nationalization Era 

Shortly before nationalization, there was a gathering of all of the coastal Mandar kings, where they all decided it was in their best interest to unite under the new Indonesian flag. The kings cooperated with the representatives sent from this new government and the kingdoms officially dissolved in 1948 when the global community finally acknowledged the sovereignty of Indonesia.

The kings still held the power in the kingdoms after the country became a republic, but it wasn't until 1961 that the Indonesian government fully supported the region, allowing the kings to remain the symbolic heads of their territories until that time.

Royal familial blood lines can still be traced today and royal heritage is still coveted in society - less for political or authoritative roles and more for cultural ones instead. Furthermore, ceremonies such as weddings and Aqiqah communions for royal families are distinct from those for the non-royals.

A notable figure that emerged from Majene during this era was Baharudin Lopa. Not only did he become the first mayor of Majene in 1961 at age 19, he would later go on to lead the struggle against corruption in Indonesia during the Suharto era. His notable bravery and complete disregard for how powerful his corrupt opponents were resulted in him becoming a national hero in Indonesia. His relatives still reside in Majene today.

2021 earthquake
On January 15 2021, a magnitude 6.2 earthquake struck east of Majene. The earthquake caused extensive damage in the town, destroying many homes, buildings and schools. 108 people were killed and over 3,000 were injured, most of them in Majene and Mamuju.

Today 

The Mandar people continue to be avid fishermen (catching mainly tuna, layang, cakalang, ikan terbang, tongkol, and kakap), talented sailors, competent farmers (farming predominantly cassava, rice, coconut, and bananas), dedicated silk-weavers (especially Mandar sarongs), and creative dancers (Pattudu Tomuane for males and Pattudu Towaine for Females). They are an extremely proud people and still insist that only people of Mandar tribal origin can hold high office in the region.

Cell phone and computer repair shops have sprung up in response to the various technological needs of the people and internet cafes (warnets) are quick to open as soon as Internet services become available.

Cacao production and exportation has experienced significant growth in the region in recent years. Philippine and Chinese investors plan on building micro-hydro powered cacao processing plants near Majene by 2011.  With this acceleration in cacao production, Governor of West Sulawesi Anwar Adnan Saleh is optimistic that the region will help Indonesia to become the world's largest cocoa producer and exporter. Indonesia is currently the world's third largest cocoa producer after Côte d'Ivoire and Ghana, contributing export earnings in excess of US$1.4 billion per year.

Recently, Exxon Mobil began drilling offshore oil in the Majene regency near the village of Pamboang, just north of the capital. Very little revenue from the drilling reaches the local people.

According to locals, history will remember the Mandar people of Majene for their bravery in the face of injustices against present-day Indonesia.

Weather 

The weather in Majene is characterized by a fairly consistent hot and humid tropical climate typical of equatorial regions. Daily temperatures average around 27.5° Celsius (81.5° Fahrenheit) with a mean humidity factor of 78.3%. Overcast skies are common and can sometimes provide relief from the beating sun. There are two seasons: the rainy season and the less-rainy season. The rainy season begins in October and ends in May, while the less-rainy seasons begins in June and ends in September. The number of rain days and rainfalls from 2009 are tabulated below:

(Source: Meteorology Station from Majene Regency)

Religion 

As is common throughout Indonesia, religion plays an important role in daily life and Majene is no exception. The majority of the inhabitants of Majene are Sunni Muslim. Accordingly, several mosques can be found in town, both large and small. Some of the largest are: Majid Raya Raudatul Abidin, Masjid Agung, Masjid Abrar, Masjid Nurul Hidaya Tanjung Batu, Masjid Raudhatul Amin, and Masjid Mujahiddin Binanga. 99.74% of the inhabitants identify with Islam.

However, the Christian minority is also well-established and there are two churches in town as well. One is Protestant and the other is Catholic, and both are located in close proximity to each other. These are the only two churches located in the entire Majene Regency. 0.17% of the inhabitants identify with Protestantism and 0.05% of the inhabitants identify with Catholicism.

Other religious minorities include Hindus (0.01%), Buddhists (0.01%), other (0.01%), and N/A (0.01%).

Town layout 

Majene is a coastal town (bordered by the Mandar Bay to the south and the strait of Makassar to the west), comfortably nestled in a semicircular valley against a backdrop of rolling, forested hills. The town covers a total area of 55.19 square kilometers.

Jl. Jenderal Sudirman is the main road that goes through the town. Several important offices and buildings can be found on this street, including the police station, the bureau of educational affairs, the mayor's office, as well as a handful of basic, family-run hotels.

Several different kinds of houses can be found in the town. These include traditional stilted houses, western houses, modern dwellings, combined shops/houses (ruko), and even roadside shacks...many of which are unfinished works-in-progress. A large network of open-air sewage and drainage canals line the streets and neighborhoods and connect to a large central canal that flows into the sea.

The town is divided into two districts: Banggae and Banggae Timur, subdivided into 17 administrative villages (6 urban kelurahan and 11 rural desa).

The town is further divided into 34 distinct neighborhoods. These include:

 Lutang
 Lembang
 Binanga
 Labuang
 Tanjung Batu
 Tangnga-Tangnga
 Parappe
 Pappota
 Kampung Baru
 Lipu
 Pakkola
 Tulu
 Tunda
 Galung Selatan
 Galung Utara
 Galung Barat
 Galung Timur
 Galung Tengah
 Simule
 Cepala
 Kota
 Balanipa
 Salepa
 Batayang
 Pengali-ali
 Cilallang
 Deteng-Deteng
 Garogo
 Camba
 Pasanggrahan
 Tanangan
 Paleo
 Timbo-Timbo
 Purale
 Salabose

Each neighborhood appoints a local “Kepala Lingkungan”, who supervises the community, remains alert should any suspicious activity manifest itself, and approves projects that take place in the neighborhood.

Education 

The town of Majene is very proud of its commitment to education and is vying for the unofficial title of “Educational Capital of West Sulawesi”. The capital of Mamuju already claims the title of “Political Capital” while the town of Polewali further east along the province's south coast claims the title of “Business Capital” of the province.

There are three public high schools (SMA), five public vocational high schools (SMK), four public middle schools (SMP) and over sixty public elementary schools (SD) located within the town limits.

There are also a handful of religious schools in Majene, including both Islamic private schools (Madrasah) and Islamic boarding schools (Pesantren). There are two religious high schools (SMA), three religious middle schools (SMP Madrasah Tsanawyah), and five religious elementary schools (Madrasah Ibtidayah)

Sulawesi Barat University (Universitas Sulawesi Barat) was officially opened on February 19, 2011 by the Vice President of Indonesia, Boediono.  Official status as a prestigious state-run university is still pending.

Politics 

There are several political parties throughout the town. Politics plays an important role in daily life and it is not uncommon for campaign posters to line the streets of the town year-round.

The current mayor for the entire Majene Regency was Kalma Katta. His residence and office are both located in the town of Majene on a cliff overlooking the sea. He was a member of the “Working Group” (Golongan Karya) party and was up for re-election in May 2011. Mayoral elections take place every 5 years.

In terms of national representation, the entire province of West Sulawesi (Sulawesi Barat) is represented by 4 constituents belonging to DPD and two constituents belonging to DPR, all of whom work in Jakarta. The representatives from DPD are Asri Anas (from Polewali), K.H. Syibli (from Polewali), Iskandar Muda Barlop (from Polewali), and Mulyana Isham (from Mamuju). The representatives from DPR are Salim S. Mengga (from the Democratic Party in Polewali) and Hendra Singkarru (from the PAN party in Polewali). Congressional elections take place every 5 years.

Transportation 

The bus station is the central hub for all long-distance transportation in and out of the town. This station is serviced by two bus companies, Litha and Co. and PIPOSS, both of which operate economy busses and air-conditioned VIP coaches. At present, Makassar is the only destination for these buses, though it is common for them to stop several times along the way to let passengers off between Majene and Makassar. Each company schedules a morning and evening departure from Majene. Return tickets to Majene can only be purchased in Makassar.

Small public vans (pete-pete) also leave from the bus station to various locations within the Majene Regency (Pamboang, Somba, Malunda) and outside of it as well (Tinambung, Polewali, Mamuju, Tapalang).

Private cars (Panther, Kijang, or Travelo) can also be chartered to take passengers virtually anywhere on the island.

Air travel out of Majene is impossible as there is no airstrip and the closest airports are in Mamuju (3 hours north) and Makassar (7.5 hours south).

In terms of transportation within the town, Pedicabs (becak), hired motorcycles (ojek), and public vans (pete-pete) are the most common ways to get around. Most Majenites drive motorcycles, though some of the more affluent inhabitants drive cars. Children get around by walking or riding bicycles.

Dining 

Owing to the homogeneity of Indonesian diets, options for dining are limited. Many food stalls only sell one or two types of food and only stay open for certain hours of the day. The city of Majene has several Javanese restaurants, a handful of warungs featuring classic Indonesian favorites, some traditional Mandar and Bugis eateries, one Chinese restaurant called “Kios Kembar”, one allegedly western restaurant called “Dobi”, a couple fresh juice bars, and several street vendors that only open at night. These vendors sell a variety of fried foods, including: martabak, sambusa, sate, mie pangsit, mie gorreng, nasi gorreng, bakso, pisang molen, tahu isi, tempe gorreng, kroket, panada, bakwan, kawossol, and pupuk.

Media 

The newspapers “Radar Sulbar” and “Media Indonesia” are the two most prominent sources of news in town, both of which cover the entire province of West Sulawesi. The towny is also serviced by smaller local newspapers and bulletins that are published periodically, as needed.

The only local TV station, Manakara, is operated out of Mamuju, but occasionally features a story from Majene.

Tourist destinations 

Top destinations in the town and surrounding area include:

Dato Beach:
Featuring white sand, hermit crabs, turquoise water, palm trees, spectacular vistas, and a staircase built into a volcanic rock outcropping, this beach has been less-frequented by locals in recent years due to superstitions stemming from the sinking of a ship and the death of all passengers aboard just offshore.

Barane Beach:
Featuring a long wooden dock, beautiful sunsets, lush vegetation (including Mimosa pudica), food sellers, and local children-chartered dinghy rides, this beach is the preferred hangout spot for middle and high school students to decompress after a long day in school.

Bukit Salabose:
Featuring a small Islamic neighborhood, an improvised soccer field, cell phone and cable towers, and neighborhood children aplenty, this destination offers a superb lookout of the entire city of Majene and the dense coconut forests that flank it to the east.

Gunung Galung:
Featuring savannah-like grasses, rolling hills, small hiking trails, and a fire-pit, this hill is opposite Bukit Salabose and can only be accessed via foot, bicycle, or motorcycle.

The Harbor:
Featuring a long dock for fishing, several traditional watercraft, and close proximity to the town centre, this spot is a popular destination amongst local children who can often be seen running and jumping off of the dock and into the salty waters below.

Somba:
Featuring long stretches of coastal highway, endless coconut and flying fish stalls, rocky beaches, and located just outside the town of Majene, this area will satisfy both your thirst and your appetite with traditional Indonesian fare.

Malle, Abaga, Mangge, and Waiturang:
There are several waterfalls surrounding the town of Majene. Most are a mere motorcycle ride away and feature small hiking trails, rustic picnic locations, and clean, rushing water for bathing.
		
Limboro:
Featuring a trio of concrete pools with steaming hot water fed by the inactive volcanoes in the region, this remote weekend destination is located adjacent to an Indo-style villa and nestled at the top of a coastal mountain and flanked by dense, foggy jungle.

Mandar Graveyard (Ondongan):
Nestled atop the hill next to the mayor's house, this tribute to the kings of Mandar past allows visitors to bask in classic nostalgia as they take in the ruins and remains attributed to the great leaders in Majene's history.

Hero Statue:
Located in the heart of the downtown strip, this iconic sculpture is a tribute to all of the heroes of Majene's past – particularly those that did everything in their power to resist oppression at the hands of foreign occupiers.

Other 

In the past three years, the town of Majene has hosted five Fulbright Scholars from America. In addition to the mission of promoting mutual understanding between the people of Indonesia and the people of the United States of America, these individuals volunteered as English teachers at the secondary school level. SMK 1, SMA 2, and SMA 1 have all hosted Fulbright Scholars for a period lasting between 1–2 years each.

See also

 List of regencies and cities of Indonesia

References 

Populated places in West Sulawesi
Regency seats of West Sulawesi